Matlin is a ghost town in the northeastern end of the Great Salt Lake Desert in western Box Elder County, Utah, United States.

Description

The former town was established by the Central Pacific Railroad (CPRR) on April 5, 1869. Chinese railroad workers built a small community and facilities to support the track section. The town relied on the railroad through its entire history. In 1904 the site was abandoned when the Lucin Cutoff was finished. Records indicate that the population was 15 people in 1870 and 25 in 1876. These numbers most likely did not include Chinese residents.

All that is left of the town is the profile in the rail grade of a wye built in 1900.

The fire damaged some, and destroyed many other, significant artifacts that had previously remained at the site. In describing the area after the fire, Chris Merritt (a historic preservation officer for the Utah Division of State History) stated, "It just looked like this giant shadow across the land, like driving into Mordor."

See also

 List of ghost towns in Utah
 Central Pacific Railroad Grade Historic District

References

External links

Ghost towns in Utah
Ghost towns in Box Elder County, Utah
Populated places established in 1869
1869 establishments in Utah Territory